The 2008–09 Arizona Wildcats men's basketball team represented the University of Arizona during the 2008–09 NCAA Division I men's basketball season. The Wildcats, led by first year head coach Russ Pennell, played their home games at the McKale Center and are members of the Pacific-10 Conference.

Recruiting class
Source:

Roster

Depth chart

Schedule

|-
!colspan=9 style="background:#; color:white;"| Exhibition

|-
!colspan=9 style="background:#; color:white;"| Regular season

|-
!colspan=9 style="background:#;"| Pac-10 Tournament

|-
!colspan=9 style="background:#;"| NCAA tournament

Awards
Chase Budinger
Pac-10 All-Conference First Team
Pac-10 Player of the Week – February 2, 2009
Jordan Hill
Pac-10 All-Conference First Team
Pac-10 Player of the Week – December 15, 2008
Nic Wise
Pac-10 All-Conference Second Team
Pac-10 Player of the Week – February 16, 2009
Jamelle Horne
Pac-10 Player of the Week – December 29, 2008

References

Arizona Wildcats men's basketball seasons
Arizona
Arizona
Arizona Wildcats
Arizona Wildcats